A stakeholder  register is a document that describes who (individual or group) is affected by a project, and their effect and impact on the project. A stakeholder  register is ideally completed early in the project to ensure proper engagement of stakeholders. Sources for the register include:
 Project sponsor
 Senior leadership
 Project business case
 Project charter
 Analysis or research
 Subject matter experts

Contents 
Contents include:
 Name 
 Functioning Department 
 Job title 
 Project role
 Significance
 Category

See also 
Project stakeholder
Stakeholder analysis
Stakeholder engagement software
Stakeholder management

References

External links
 [PDF] Stakeholder Register Stakeholder Register Guide

Project management
Business planning